The Utrecht Shield is a hypothetical women's rugby union trophy. 
The men's rugby union version is the Raeburn Shield. 
The trophy is named after Utrecht the site of the first ever international between the Netherlands and France, on 13 June 1982. 
The concept is that it is a Title Holders Shield, similar to a Boxing World Title or the Ranfurly Shield in New Zealand.

The proposed advantages are:

 As it would be decided on a single game, there would be increased chances of producing a Title Holder from a non Top Tier nation, giving more chance for an underdog to win a title.
 Title games would become more interesting, as the title holder would have something to play for, and the underdog would have extra motivation to lift their game.
 These Title games would occur much more frequently than the World Cup.

List of shield holders

Most shield defences

Notes

See also 

 List of rugby union competitions

References 

Rugby union trophies and awards